Quartet (1996) is the eighth album by the Pat Metheny Group. The album features Pat Metheny on guitar, Lyle Mays on keyboards, Steve Rodby on bass, and Paul Wertico on drums. The approach for the album was to not write lengthy compositions before recording but instead use merely sketches and rely mostly on improvisation in a setting with just acoustic instruments. A departure from the usual thoroughly orchestrated sound using synthesizers and sequencing the Group is usually known for.  The result is experimental, moody, and loose, even dark in some moments. The instrumentation relies mostly on acoustic instruments including various keyboard instruments such as the spinet piano, Harmonium, Fender Rhodes, autoharp and various guitars including the 42-string Pikasso guitar. The Roland GR-303 makes appearances on "Oceania" and "Language of Time".

With the exception of "When We Were Free" on the Group's final Songbook Tour, the Group itself never played these songs live. "When We Were Free" however has been played in various other trios and groups centered around Metheny including a version recorded on Day Trip. Michael Brecker recorded versions of "As I Am" (on Time Is of the Essence), "Second Thought" and "Sometimes I See" (on Nearness of You: The Ballad Book).

Track listing

Personnel 
 Pat Metheny – 12-string guitar, acoustic and electric guitars, slide guitar, guitar synthesizer, 42-string Pikasso guitar
 Lyle Mays – autoharp, celeste, clavichord, harmonium, piano, electric piano
 Steve Rodby – double bass, piccolo bass
 Paul Wertico – drums, percussion

Production
 Pat Metheny – producer
 David Oakes – associate producer, technical coordinator
 Rob Eaton – engineer (mixing)
 Ted Jensen – engineer (mastering)
 Joe Lizzi – assistant engineer

References

Pat Metheny albums
1996 albums
Geffen Records albums